Eyikyar (Eyikeer) is a rural locality (a selo) in Khadansky Rural Okrug of Suntarsky District in the Sakha Republic, Russia, located  from Suntar, the administrative center of the district, and  from Agdary, the administrative center of the rural okrug. Its population as of the 2010 Census was 7; up from 2 recorded in the 2002 Census.

References

Notes

Sources
Official website of the Sakha Republic. Registry of the Administrative-Territorial Divisions of the Sakha Republic. Suntarsky District. 

Rural localities in Suntarsky District